Nandini Trivedi is an Indian-American physicist and Professor of Physics at Ohio State University. Her research is on the emergence of new states of matter arising from strong interactions between electrons in quantum materials. She was elected a Fellow of the American Association for the Advancement of Science in 2020.

Early life and education 
Trivedi started her scientific career at the Indian Institutes of Technology. She moved to Cornell University for her graduate studies, where she worked on transport in disordered systems and quantum size effects in thin film heterostructures. After earning her doctorate, Trivedi was a postdoctoral research fellow at the University of Illinois at Urbana–Champaign and at the State University of New York in Stony Brook.

Research and career 
Trivedi started her career at the Argonne National Laboratory as an assistant scientist and got promoted to scientist. She then joined the Tata Institute of Fundamental Research as a faculty in 1995.  In 2004 Trivedi joined Ohio State University as a Professor in the Department of Physics. Her research explores the emergence of new phases of matter in condensed matter systems.

Awards and honours 

 2010 Elected Fellow of the American Physical Society
 2015 Simons Foundation Fellow
 2019 Ohio State University Distinguished Scholar
 2020 Elected Fellow of the American Association for the Advancement of Science

Select publications

References 

Living people
Year of birth missing (living people)
American people of Indian descent
Indian Institutes of Technology alumni
Cornell University alumni
Ohio State University faculty
Condensed matter physicists
Fellows of the American Association for the Advancement of Science
Fellows of the American Physical Society